The Face at the Window is a 1932 British drama film directed by Leslie S. Hiscott and starring Raymond Massey, Claude Hulbert and Isla Bevan. It was made at Twickenham Studios as a quota quickie. It is based on a play of the same name by F. Brooke Warren first performed in 1897.

Story
Opening in the shadowed half-light of a bank vault in Paris, where a watchman has been mysteriously murdered, the picture centres around the methods of detective Paul Le Gros - played by Raymond Massey - to solve the identity of a masked criminal called "Le Loup" (The Wolf), who kills with an injection of poison with a finger ring. As Peter Pomeroy, the detective's useless assistant, Claude Hulbert provides a spot of comedy.

Cast
 Raymond Massey as Paul le Gros  
 Isla Bevan as Marie de Brisson  
 Claude Hulbert as Peter Pomeroy  
 Eric Maturin as Count Fournal  
 Henry Mollison as Lucien Courtier  
 A. Bromley Davenport as Gaston de Brisson  
 Harold Meade  as Dr. Renard  
 Dennis Wyndham as Lafonde  
 Charles Groves as Jacques

References

Bibliography
 Low, Rachael. Filmmaking in 1930s Britain. George Allen & Unwin, 1985.
 Wood, Linda. British Films, 1927-1939. British Film Institute, 1986.

External links

1932 films
1932 crime drama films
1930s English-language films
Films directed by Leslie S. Hiscott
British crime drama films
Quota quickies
Films shot at Twickenham Film Studios
British black-and-white films
1930s British films